Hakan Haslaman (August 27, 1974) is a Turkish stuntman, who also works as director and film producer.

He has helped introduce Asian stunt techniques in Europe. He also wrote a stunt textbook.
 
Haslaman is the founder of the Turkish martial art Amarok (Az Rak Oguz Alpagutnung Mengu Köresi).

He was the first Turkish member of tne Hollywood Taurus Stunt Awards Academy.

Feature films

 Duello 2006 (DVD): producer, director and star.
 The Tent 2008 (movie): producer and director.
 Kreuzberg - Slums of Society 2009 (pre-production feature film): producer and director.

Books 
 Stunts, instructions for true heroes. Bender Verlag Mainz, .
 Saka Kartalı (Wild West), The Legend of Su Kagan, .
 Alpağut. Panama Yayıncılık Ankara, .

Invention
 Body fire: Fire that burns without protective clothing on the body.

External links 

 Hollywood – Taurus World Stunt Awards
 Stuntszene Production

Turkish film producers
Turkish stunt performers
Living people
Year of birth missing (living people)